According to Western experts, robberies, homicide and other violent crimes in the Soviet Union were less prevalent than in the United States because the Soviet Union had a larger police force and had a low occurrence of drug abuse. Corruption in the form of bribery was common, primarily due to the paucity of goods and services on the open market.

Ideology
Soviet criminology was significantly influenced by the works of Stalinist prosecutor Andrey Vyshinsky who introduced a number of measures into the penal code and investigatory practice that were unusual in other legal systems.  Law was to be perceived not as  means of determining individual guilt but dialectically and as part of broader class struggle. Based on that premise, people could be convicted even with absence of actual crime but if they merely belonged to a vaguely defined bourgeois class or if their conviction would be broadly beneficial for the revolutionary movement. 

Apart from this judicial practice, the penal code of USSR contained a number of  very specific crimes generally classified as "counter-revolutionary", such as contacts with foreigners or any other kind of opposition or criticism of the communist party. Article 70 listed "anti-Soviet propaganda". Article 83 - "illegally leaving USSR". Article 190-1 punished dissemination, "in verbal form", of "knowingly false" statements, defaming USSR or its social structure.
Speculation, defined as any form of private trade with intent to make profit, was also a crime per article 154 of the Penal Code of USSR. Article 162 made a crime engaging in "banned" crafts or forms of employment.

A basic premise of Marxism is that crime is a socio-economic phenomenon:  Some Marxist theorists contended that the most immediate reasons for crime in the Soviet Union were mental retardation, poor upbringing, and capitalist influence. This led to novel inventions in the field of psychiatry ("delusion of reformism", sluggish schizophrenia) used as an instrument of repression against critics.

Punishment
In 1989 the Soviet Union had few prisons. About 99% of convicted criminals served their sentences in labor camps, supervised by the Main Directorate for Corrective Labor Camps which was under the MVD. The camps had four regimes of ascending severity. In the strict-regime camps, inmates worked at the most difficult jobs, usually outdoors, and received meager rations. Jobs were less demanding and rations better in the camps with milder regimes. The system of corrective labor was regarded by Soviet authorities successful in that the rate of recidivism was quite low. Prisons and labor camps, in the views of former inmates and Western observers, however, were notorious for their harsh conditions, arbitrary and sadistic treatment of prisoners, and flagrant human rights abuses. In 1989 new legislation, which emphasized rehabilitation rather than punishment, was being drafted to "humanize" the special system. Nevertheless, in 1989 conditions for many prisoners had changed little.

Relocation of petty criminals outside of large cities was also quite common practice of crime management.

Death penalty

The death penalty, carried out by shooting, was applied in the Soviet Union only in cases of treason, espionage, terrorism, sabotage, certain types of murder, and large-scale theft of state property by officials. Otherwise, the maximum punishment for a first offender was fifteen years. Parole was permitted in some cases after completion of half of the sentence, and periodic amnesties sometimes also resulted in early release.

Collapse of the Soviet Union
Near and after the collapse of the Soviet Union, crime statistics moved sharply and uniformly upward. From 1991 to 1992, the number of officially reported crimes and the overall crime rate each showed a 27 percent increase; the crime rate nearly doubled between 1985 and 1992. By the early 1990s, theft, burglary, and other acts against property accounted for about two-thirds of all crime in Russia. Of particular concern to citizens, however, was the rapid growth of violent crime, including gruesome homicides.

Large parts of the Penal Code concerning crimes such as private trade (art. 154), criticism of the communist party and other political crimes (art. 58) were revoked in 1993.

See also
 Index of Soviet Union related articles
 Crime in Russia
 Marxism
 Criminology
 Kazan phenomenon

References

 
Capital punishment in the Soviet Union